William George Judd (23 October 1845 - 15 February 1922) was an English first-class cricketer.

Judd made a single first-class appearance for Hampshire against Kent in 1878. Judd made eight runs and took a single wicket, that of Francis MacKinnon.

Judd umpired a single first-class match between Hampshire and Derbyshire in 1877.

Judd died at Boscombe, Hampshire on 12 March 1925.

External links

1845 births
1922 deaths
People from New Forest District
English cricketers
Hampshire cricketers
English cricket umpires